Malomirovo is a village in the Yambol Province, south-eastern Bulgaria.  it has 409 inhabitants.

The village is probably the location of the medieval castle Versinikia near which in 813 the Bulgarian Khan Krum decisively defeated the Byzantines.

Villages in Yambol Province